Daniel Vasile Petrescu (born 22 December 1967) is a Romanian football manager and former player, who is in charge of Liga I club CFR Cluj.

As a player, Petrescu was deployed as a  full-back or a winger and represented Premier League teams Sheffield Wednesday, Chelsea, Bradford City and Southampton. He notably played in the 1989 European Cup final with Steaua București and won the 1998 UEFA Cup Winners' Cup with Chelsea. Petrescu also played in Serie A with Genoa, as well as having spells with Foggia and Olt Scornicești. He earned 95 caps for the Romania national team, being selected in two World Cup squads, in 1994 and 1998, and in two European Championships, in 1996 and 2000.

Petrescu became player-assistant manager to Walter Zenga at Național București towards the end of his playing career, and has since had an extensive career as a head coach in Poland, Russia, the United Arab Emirates, Qatar, China and Turkey, in addition to his native country. His first job was at Sportul Studențesc, which he led to Liga I promotion. Petrescu has won domestic honours with Unirea Urziceni, Kuban Krasnodar, ASA Târgu Mureș, Jiangsu Suning and CFR Cluj. He is the second-most successful manager in Romania, tied with Emerich Jenei, winning the league on six occasions (five times with CFR Cluj and once with Urziceni), and was also named Romania Coach of the Year a record five times, tied with Mircea Lucescu.

Playing career

Club
After playing for Steaua București's youth teams, Petrescu was promoted into the first team in 1986 in a match played by Steaua just one month after winning the European Cup. He was loaned to Olt Scornicești for the 1986–87 season, but asked to return to Steaua in 1987.

Petrescu was part of the Steaua squad that reached the European Cup semi-finals (1988) and the final (1989).

In 1991, Petrescu was bought by Italian club Foggia in a period when the club saw promotion to Serie A. In 1993, he moved to Genoa.

Petrescu signed for Sheffield Wednesday in 1994 from Genoa, after a successful 1994 World Cup for Romania. After one season at Hillsborough, he signed for Chelsea and featured prominently there for the next five years. During his term at Chelsea, he was a member of the teams which won the FA Cup in 1997 and the League Cup and Cup Winners' Cup (both in 1998). After falling out with Chelsea manager Gianluca Vialli after a defeat to Manchester United (a game in which he scored), Petrescu never played for the club again and was not even selected as a substitute for the 2000 FA Cup final against Aston Villa.

Turning down a move to Southampton in August 2000, he instead moved to Bradford City for £1 million, scoring one goal, against West Ham United.

In January 2001, Petrescu's former Chelsea manager, Glenn Hoddle, eventually persuaded him to join Southampton for a "nominal" fee. He initially settled in well at The Dell, scoring against Leicester City and Manchester City in his first few matches. In March, Hoddle left the Saints to take up the managerial reins at Tottenham Hotspur and his replacement, Stuart Gray, dropped Petrescu, replacing him with Hassan Kachloul for the remainder of the season. After making only two substitute appearances in the 2001–02 season, Petrescu was released and returned to Romania.

Petrescu returned to his native Bucharest for a last season as a footballer, with Național București. His last match was the Cupa României final, on 31 May 2003; Național lost 1–0 to Dinamo București, during which Petrescu received much abuse from some of the Dinamo fans as he left the pitch at the end of 90 minutes, even though it was the last game of one of Romania's greatest footballers. Presumably, this was because he used to play for Dinamo's greatest rivals, Steaua.

International
Petrescu registered 95 caps for the senior Romania national team. He made his debut in 1989 and played at four major tournaments: the 1994 World Cup, UEFA Euro 1996, the 1998 World Cup (where the entire Romania squad famously dyed their hair blonde after losing a bet with head coach Anghel Iordănescu), and Euro 2000.

Petrescu missed the 1990 World Cup due to injury. In 1994, Petrescu played in his first World Cup, held in the United States. He scored the only goal in a win against the United States which saw Romania qualify for the second round as group winners. They were then handed a difficult game against Argentina which they managed to win, only to lose to Sweden on penalties in the quarter-finals, with Petrescu one of two Romanians to miss his spot-kick. The miss still haunts him today. "It will probably stay with me for the rest of my life", he said. After the World Cup, he flew to Saint Thomas and spent two weeks in the Caribbean region.

Euro 1996 was a disappointment for Romania, as they lost all three group matches and only managed to score one goal.

At the 1998 World Cup in France, Petrescu raced past his Chelsea teammate Graeme Le Saux and scored the winning goal against England, which effectively won them the group and ensured they would not have to face Argentina in the second round. He became the second Romanian player to score in two different World Cups after Ștefan Dobay. The Romanians, however, lost their second round match to Croatia, 1–0.

Petrescu was an important piece of the Romanian team at Euro 2000, where they survived a group with Portugal, Germany and England. A new victory over the English team was decisive to qualify for quarter-finals. Romania won all the matches where Petrescu scored.

Managerial career
After retiring in 2003, Petrescu pursued a career as a coach. He began his managerial career in July 2003 with second division side Sportul Studențesc, whom he led to promotion before taking over at Rapid Bucharest in December, but stepped down in April 2004, after only six games and four months at the helm. He then returned for a second spell at Sportul Studențesc, where he helped the club to a seventh-place finish in Diviza A.

Wisła Kraków
In December 2005, Petrescu agreed to manage 2004–05 Ekstraklasa champions Wisła Kraków in Poland, replacing caretaker manager Tomasz Kulawik. Wisła finished second in the 2005–06 championship. He was dismissed as manager of Wisła on 18 September 2006 after unconvincing results to begin the 2006–07 season. Petrescu accused the Wisła players for not wanting to train hard to improve their performances.

Unirea Urziceni

About one week after his termination, Petrescu was appointed as manager of Romanian Liga I newly promoted club Unirea Urziceni, with which he had considerable leading. Under his management, Unirea Urziceni was runner-up in the 2007–08 Cupa României and qualified for the 2008–09 UEFA Cup. He was considered for the vacant manager's position at his former club Steaua București after Marius Lăcătuș' resignation in October 2008. Dorinel Munteanu was appointed instead, but Petrescu has not ruled out a future role at the club. In May 2009, Petrescu won the Liga I title with outsiders Unirea Urziceni, the first title for both Petrescu and his club, and consequently achieving qualification to the 2009–10 UEFA Champions League, during which he led Unirea to a shock 4–1 victory at Ibrox against Rangers and a win against Sevilla at home, 1–0.

Petrescu resigned as manager of Unirea Urziceni in December 2009.

Kuban Krasnodar

On 28 December 2009, Russian First Division club Kuban Krasnodar hired Petrescu on a five-year contract. Petrescu managed to gain promotion to the Russian Premier League in his debut season, winning the 2010 Russian First Division with a total of 80 points, nine clear of second place. His team conceded only 20 goals in 38 matches.

On 14 August 2012, it was announced that Petrescu had resigned as Kuban Krasnodar manager, citing the need for a new challenge. Kuban later participated in the UEFA Europa League for the first time.

Dynamo Moscow
Shortly after his resignation, in August 2012 Petrescu signed a three-year contract reportedly worth €2.5 million per year to join Dynamo Moscow.

On 8 April 2014, his contract was terminated by mutual agreement after a heavy loss to outsiders Anzhi Makhachkala, 0–4. Dynamo Moscow director of sports Guram Adzhoyev stated, "Last year Dan drew the team from the complicated situation, lifted it to the certain level, but recently we have seen no progress."

Al-Arabi 
In June 2014, Petrescu agreed to coach Qatari side Al-Arabi. On 1 December 2014, his contract with the club was terminated after a mutual agreement.

Târgu Mureș 
On 10 June 2015, Petrescu was announced as the new manager of Liga I runner-up ASA Târgu Mureș. His first, and only, match in charge was in the Supercupa României against champions Steaua București ended with Târgu Mureș winning 1–0. He resigned the next day, to take up a lucrative contract with Chinese side Jiangsu Suning.

Jiangsu Suning
On 9 July 2015, Petrescu left Târgu Mureș, claiming his decision was due to the club's growing financial problems, though he was immediately hired as manager of Chinese Super League club Jiangsu Suning on a lucrative deal. Petrescu said in a statement, "It's very hard to leave the team in this moment. I don't how it'll be in China, I hope it will be like in Russia." In his first season in charge, Petrescu guided the club to victory in the 2015 Chinese FA Cup. On 3 June 2016, Suning announced that Petrescu will no longer be the manager of the club.

Kuban Krasnodar 
On 14 June 2016, Petrescu signed a two-year contract with Kuban Krasnodar, after the club was relegated to the second-tier Russian National Football League. On 4 October 2016, with Kuban winning only 3 out of first 15 games and sitting in the 14th spot in the league instead of the expected fight for promotion, he left Kuban by mutual consent, stating that the club had not paid him.

On 29 October 2016, Petrescu was announced as the manager of Emirates Arabian Gulf League side Al-Nasr until the end of the season. He led the club to the final match of the UAE President's Cup but was defeated by Al-Wahda in his last game in charge. Al-Nasr appointed Cesare Prandelli as his replacement.

CFR Cluj
On 10 June 2017, he was appointed head coach of Liga I club CFR Cluj. On 20 May 2018, Cluj were crowned as Liga I champions for the 2017–18 season after a 1–0 victory over Viitorul Constanța.

On 7 June 2018, he was announced as the manager of Chinese club Guizhou Hengfeng to replace Gregorio Manzano.

Return to CFR Cluj
On 22 March 2019, Petrescu returned as manager of CFR Cluj after the club had experienced a string of poor performances in the league. He managed to win the 2018-19 Liga I title, successfully defending the trophy he won one year prior. The next season, CFR Cluj sought to have an ambitious European campaign, with the goal to qualify for the group stages of a European Competition. Petrescu guided his side to the 2019-20 Europa League group stage, after a loss in the 2019-20 Champions League playoffs against Slavia Praha, eliminating Scottish giants Celtic on the way. In the group stages, he faced Italian giants SS Lazio, Stade Rennais and meeting Celtic once again, proving to be an almost impossible challenge for CFR. However, with two wins over Stade Rennais and one win over Lazio and Celtic each, CFR finished second in the group stages and qualified for the knock-out phase of the Europa League. There, Petrescu met Spanish giants Sevilla and were eliminated after a 1-1 and 0-0 draws. The team's performance in Europe was praised by Romanian media, and Petrescu himself claims it was one of the highlights of his career.

Domestically, CFR were able to maintain their dominance, winning the regular season of the 2019-20 Liga I by a comfortable margin. However, the playoffs proved to be a much bigger challenge, as the COVID pandemic allowed Craiova to stabilize and pose a challenge to Petrescu's side. While Craiova lead the standings for most of the playoff phase, following a win on CFR's ground and CFR's draws against Astra Giurgiu and Gaz Metan Medias, CFR won the reverse fixture against Craiova on the last matchday, thus securing their third consecutive title.

On 19 August 2020, CFR restarted the European campaign against Maltese champions Floriana FC with a 2–0 victory but were eliminated in the second round by Dinamo Zagreb on penalties. After CFR was eliminated from the Europa League, and had begun to faltering domestically, Petrescu announced on 30 November that he and the club had agreed to terminate his contract.

Third spell at CFR Cluj
On 28 August 2021, after a weak European campaign which saw the club fail to qualify for the Europa League, CFR Cluj's owner Nelutu Varga dismissed Marius Sumudica, and after few days of negotiations,  Petrescu signed a contract on 31 August for a third stint at CFR Cluj. On May 15, 2022, Petrescu won his 4th league, and CFR's 5th consecutive championship after a 2–1 win over Universitatea Craiova, establishing the Hegemony of CFR Cluj in Romanian football.

Personal life 
Petrescu was married to Daniela Carmen from 1992 to 2003, with whom he has two daughters: Rebecca (born 1994) and Beatrice Chelsea (born 1998). He named one of his daughters "Chelsea" in honour of one of his former clubs. In May 2007, he married Adriana Stan, a former athlete. The couple have a daughter together, Jennifer, born in 2008.

Career statistics

Club

International

Scores and results list Romania's goal tally first, score column indicates score after each Petrescu goal.

Managerial record

Honours

Player
Steaua București
 Divizia A: 1985–86, 1987–88, 1988–89
 Cupa României: 1988–89
 European Cup:  Runner-up 1988–89

Chelsea
 FA Cup: 1996–97 
 League Cup: 1997–98
 UEFA Cup Winners' Cup: 1997–98
 UEFA Super Cup: 1998

Național București
 Cupa României: Runner-up 2002–03

Individual
 Overseas Team of the Decade – Premier League 10 Seasons Awards (1993 to 2003)

Manager
Unirea Urziceni
Liga I: 2008–09
Cupa României: Runner-up 2007–08

Kuban Krasnodar
Russian First Division: 2010

ASA Târgu Mureș
Supercupa României: 2015

Jiangsu Suning
Chinese FA Cup: 2015

CFR Cluj
Liga I: 2017–18, 2018–19, 2019–20, 2020–21, 2021–22

Individual
 Romania Coach of the Year: 2008, 2009, 2011, 2019, 2022

References

External links
 
 
 
 

1967 births
Living people
Footballers from Bucharest
Romanian footballers
Association football wingers
Romania international footballers
1994 FIFA World Cup players
UEFA Euro 1996 players
1998 FIFA World Cup players
UEFA Euro 2000 players
Liga I players
Serie A players
Premier League players
FA Cup Final players
FC Steaua București players
FC Olt Scornicești players
Calcio Foggia 1920 players
Genoa C.F.C. players
Sheffield Wednesday F.C. players
Chelsea F.C. players
Bradford City A.F.C. players
Southampton F.C. players
Romanian football managers
Russian Premier League managers
UAE Pro League managers
Chinese Super League managers
FC Sportul Studențesc București managers
FC Rapid București managers
Wisła Kraków managers
FC Unirea Urziceni managers
FC Kuban Krasnodar managers
FC Dynamo Moscow managers
Al-Arabi SC (Qatar) managers
Jiangsu F.C. managers
ASA 2013 Târgu Mureș managers
Al-Nasr SC (Dubai) managers
CFR Cluj managers
Kayserispor managers
Guizhou F.C. managers
Romanian expatriate footballers
Romanian expatriate football managers
Romanian expatriate sportspeople in Italy
Expatriate footballers in Italy
Romanian expatriate sportspeople in England
Expatriate footballers in England
Expatriate football managers in Poland
Romanian expatriate sportspeople in Russia
Expatriate football managers in Russia
Romanian expatriate sportspeople in Qatar
Expatriate football managers in Qatar
Romanian expatriate sportspeople in China
Expatriate football managers in China
Romanian expatriate sportspeople in the United Arab Emirates
Expatriate football managers in the United Arab Emirates
Romanian expatriate sportspeople in Turkey
Expatriate football managers in Turkey